The Moniteur ottoman was a newspaper written in French and first published in 1831 on the order of Mahmud II. It was the first official gazette of the Ottoman Empire, edited by Alexandre Blacque at the expense of the Sublime Porte. Its name perhaps referred to the French newspaper Le Moniteur Universel. It was issued weekly. Mahmud II wished to influence Europeans. Takvim-i vekayi was published a few months later, intended as a translation of the Moniteur into Ottoman Turkish.

History 
The Moniteur ottoman was the first Ottoman bulletin. It was apparently inspired by Muhammad Ali's Al-Waqa'i' al-Misriyya, published in Egypt since 1828.

After having been edited by former Consul for Denmark "M. Franceschi", and later on by "Hassuna de Ghiez", it was lastly edited by Lucien Rouet. However, facing the hostility of embassies, it was closed in the 1840s. The title of the publication was used in Othōmanikos Mēnytōr, the Greek edition of Takvim-i vekayi.

See also
Media of the Ottoman Empire
History of Middle Eastern newspapers

References

Sources

Annuaire des deux mondes : histoire générale des divers États.
Ubicini. A. État présent de l'empire ottoman.
L'ami de la religion.

French-language newspapers published in Ottoman Empire
Publications established in 1831
Defunct newspapers published in the Ottoman Empire
1831 establishments in the Ottoman Empire
1840s disestablishments in the Ottoman Empire
Government gazettes
Tanzimat
Publications with year of disestablishment missing